Hoensbroek is a railway station located in Hoensbroek, The Netherlands. The station was opened in 1896 and is located on the Sittard–Herzogenrath railway. Train services are operated by Arriva.

Train services
The following local train services call at this station:
Stoptrein: Sittard–Heerlen–Kerkrade

References

External links
NS website 
Dutch public transport travel planner 

Railway stations in Heerlen
Railway stations opened in 1893